Since Missoula, Montana's founding in 1866 it has progressed from small trading post with a single cross street on Mullan Road and a bridge across the Clark Fork River to a vibrant college town home to the University of Montana.  Architectural styles have come and gone, and today Missoula is home to over 60 buildings on the National Register of Historic Places beginning with the A.J. Gibson designed County Courthouse constructed in 1908 and added to the list in 1976 with the Post Office, Wilma Theatre and Higgin's Block all added a couple years later.

Historical buildings and districts

Sports venues

 Washington–Grizzly Stadium
 Ogren Park at Allegiance Field
 Glacier Ice Rink
 Dornblaser Field
 Dahlberg Arena
 Cook Court

University of Montana buildings

Tallest buildings in Missoula

Buildings under construction

References